Jackie or Jacky is a given name or nickname for both males and females, originally a pet form of Jack, John, Jacques, Jacqueline, etc.

People

Men 

 Jackie Bradley Jr. (born 1990), American Major League Baseball player
 Jackie Chan (born 1954), Hong Kong martial artist, actor, film director, producer, stuntman, and singer.
 Jacky Cheung (born 1961), Hong Kong singer-songwriter and actor
 John Jackie Cooper (1922–2011), American actor and TV producer
 Jackie Davis (1920–1999), American jazz singer, organist and bandleader
 Jacky Duguépéroux (born 1948), French football manager and former player
 Jacky Durand (born 1967), French retired road bicycle racer
 Jacques Fatton (1925–2011), Swiss footballer
 Jackie Fields (born Jacob Finkelstein, 1908–1984), American world and Olympic champion boxer 
 John Fisher, 1st Baron Fisher (1841–1920), British admiral
 Jackie Earle Haley (born 1961), American actor
 John Jackie Gleason (1916–1987), American comedian and actor
 Jacques Jacky Ickx (born 1945), Belgian racing driver
 Jacky Ido (born 1977), Burkinabe-born French actor
 Jackie Lee (country singer) (born 1991), American country music singer-songwriter
 Jack Jacky Lee (1938–2016), American Football League and National Football League quarterback
 Jacques Lemée (born 1946), French retired football player and manager
 John Jackie Lomax (1944–2013), English singer-songwriter and guitarist
 Jackie Mason, American comedian and actor born Yacov Moshe Maza (born 1931)
 Jacky Mathijssen (born 1963), Dutch football manager and former player
 Jackie Milburn, (1924–1988) English football player
 Jacques Jacky Munaron (born 1956), Belgian former football goalkeeper
 John Jackie McLean (1931–2006), American saxophonist and composer
 John Jackie McNamara Sr. (born 1952), Scottish retired footballer
 Jackie McNamara (born 1973), Scottish footballer, son of the above
 Jacky Planchard (born 1947), French retired football player and manager
 Jack Jackie Robinson (1919–1972), American Hall-of-Fame baseball player who broke the color barrier in Major League Baseball
 Robert Lloyd Jackson Jackie Robinson (basketball, born 1927), American basketball player in the 1948 Summer Olympics
 Jackie Robinson (basketball, born 1955), American professional basketball player
 John Jackie Robinson (footballer) (1917–1972), British footballer who played for Sheffield Wednesday and Sunderland
 Jackie Robinson (musician), Jamaican singer and lead vocalist with The Pioneers
 John Jackie Stewart (born 1939), Scottish racing driver
 Jackie Vernon (born Ralph Verrone, 1924-1987), American comedian and actor who voiced Frosty the Snowman in two animated TV specials
 Jackie Wallace (born 1951), American professional football player 
 Jack Jackie Wilson (1934–1984), American soul singer-songwriter and performer

Women 

 Jackie Brambles, British journalist, radio DJ and television presenter
 Jacqueline Jackie Burroughs, English-born Canadian actress
 Jacky Cullum Chisholm, American gospel singer born Jacqueline Cullum (born 1948)
 Jackie Coakley, University of Virginia student behind false rape allegations in retracted Rolling Stone article A Rape on Campus
 Jacqueline Jackie Collins (1937–2015), British romance novelist
 Jackie Davis (writer) (born 1963), New Zealand author, poet, and playwright
 Jackie DeShannon, American singer-songwriter
 Jacqueline Jackie Evancho (born 2000), American classical crossover singer
 Jacky Fleming (born 1955), cartoonist
 Jackie Francois, American Christian musician
 Jacqueline Jackie French (born 1953), Australian author
 Jacquelyn Jackie Gayda, American wrestler
 Jackie Guerrido, Puerto Rican television weather forecaster and journalist
 Jackie Jones, British politician
 Jacqueline Jackie Joyner-Kersee, American track and field athlete
 Jackie Kabler (born 1970), British newsreader
 Jackie Kashian, American stand-up comedian
 Jacqueline Kennedy Onassis (1929–1994), American wife of President John F. Kennedy and Greek shipping magnate Aristotle Onassis, and fashion icon
 Jackie Lee (Irish singer), born Jacqueline Flood in 1936
 Jacqueline Jackie Loughery, first winner of the Miss USA competition
 Jackie Maxwell (born 1956), Canadian theatre director
 Jackie Saccoccio (1963–2020), American abstract painter
 Jacqueline Jackie Stallone, American astrologer, dancer and wrestling promoter
 Jackie Trent (1940–2015), English singer-songwriter and actress born Yvonne Burgess
 Jackie Wolcott, American diplomat
 Jackie Yi-Ru Ying (born 1966), Taiwanese-born American scientist

Fictional characters 
 
 Jacky, the main character in the book series Bloody Jack
 Jackie (Cyberchase), a cartoon character on Cyberchase
 Jackie Boone, in Kim Stanley Robinson's Mars Trilogy of novels
 Jacqueline Ingrid Bouvier, TV cartoon character on The Simpsons
 Jacqueline "Jackie" Brown, the main character from Quentin Tarantino's 1997 film Jackie Brown, played by Pam Grier
 Jacky Bryant, in the video game series Virtua Fighter
 Jackie Burkhart, on the TV series That '70s Show
 Jackie Chiles, on the TV sitcom Seinfeld
 Jackie Cook, on the TV series Veronica Mars
 Jackie Estacado, the main character of the comic series The Darkness
 Jackie Harris, on the TV sitcom Roseanne
 Jackie Hopper, on the British TV series The Story of Tracy Beaker (series 3-5), portrayed by Abby Rakic Platt
 Jackie Khones, character on Foster's Home for Imaginary Friends
 Jackie Martin, on the stop-motion TV series Glenn Martin, DDS
 Jackie Legs, the kangaroo in the film Kangaroo Jack
 Jack Rafferty, nicknamed Jackie Boy, in Frank Miller's Sin City
 Jackie Peyton, the main character of the TV sitcom Nurse Jackie
 Jackie Lynn Thomas, a recurring character on the animated TV series Star vs. the Forces of Evil
 Jackie, character in the animated TV series Bobby’s World
 Jacky Vanmarsenille, the main character in the 2011 film Bullhead played by Matthias Schoenaerts
Jackie Welles, a character in Cyberpunk 2077
 Jackie Cogan, Enforcer in the movie  Killing them softly , played by Brad Pitt
 Jackie Taylor, captain of the ill-fated girls' championship soccer team in the TV series Yellowjackets (played by Ella Purnell)

See also 

 Jacqui

English given names
English masculine given names
English feminine given names
English unisex given names
Hypocorisms

es:Jackie
fr:Jacky